...In Spite of Harry's Toenail is the debut studio album by British progressive rock band, Gnidrolog. The album was recorded in the London De Lane Lea Studios and released in 1972. A re-issue was released in 1999 and 2012, including previously unreleased material, recorded by the band in 1969 and 1971.

Track listing

Personnel 
 Colin Goldring - lead vocals, guitars, recorder, tenor sax, horn, harmonica
 Stewart Goldring - lead guitar, vocals 
 Peter "Mars" Cowling - bass guitar, cello
 Nigel Pegrum - percussion, flute, oboe, piano

References

1972 debut albums
Gnidrolog albums